Wealden is a constituency represented in the House of Commons of the UK Parliament since 2015 by Nus Ghani, a Conservative. Ghani is the first Muslim woman to be elected as a Conservative member of Parliament.

History
This seat was created in the third periodic review of constituencies in 1983, from a mixture of the previous Mid and Northern divisions of East Sussex (also known as Lewes and East Grinstead).

Political history
The seat's history is that of a safe Conservative seat.  Before the 2015 election, the Liberal Democrats, including their two predecessor parties, were represented by the main opposition candidate, but they then fell to fourth place.  The best result for the Labour Party was in 2017, though it was 39% below the winning vote share.

Prominent frontbenchers
Locally born Charles Hendry served as a Minister of State in the Department of Energy and Climate Change from 2010 to 2012 following two years in the shadow role in opposition.

Boundaries

1983–1997: The District of Wealden wards of Buxted, Chiddingly and East Hoathly, Crowborough East, Crowborough North, Crowborough West, Danehill, Fletching, Forest Row, Framfield, Frant, Hailsham Central and North, Hailsham East, Hailsham South and West, Hartfield, Heathfield, Hellingly, Horam, Maresfield, Mayfield, Rotherfield, Uckfield, Wadhurst, Waldron, and Withyam.

1997–2010: The District of Wealden wards of Buxted, Chiddingly and East Hoathly, Crowborough East, Crowborough North, Crowborough St John's, Crowborough West, Danehill, Fletching, Forest Row, Framfield, Frant, Hailsham Central and North, Hailsham East, Hailsham South and West, Hartfield, Heathfield, Hellingly, Horam, Maresfield, Mayfield, Rotherfield, Uckfield, Wadhurst, Waldron, and Withyam.

2010–present: The District of Wealden wards of Buxted and Maresfield, Chiddingly and East Hoathly, Crowborough East, Crowborough Jarvis Brook, Crowborough North, Crowborough St John's, Crowborough West, Danehill/Fletching/Nutley, Forest Row, Framfield, Frant/Withyham, Hailsham Central and North, Hailsham East, Hailsham South and West, Hartfield, Hellingly, Horam, Mayfield, Rotherfield, Uckfield Central, Uckfield New Town, Uckfield North, Uckfield Ridgewood, and Wadhurst.

The constituency covers much of the Wealden district of East Sussex. However, some of the district in the south falls into the constituencies of Lewes, Bexhill and Battle and Eastbourne.

Constituency profile
Approximately half of the population in the constituency lives in the area's three main towns: Crowborough, Hailsham and Uckfield. The rest of the seat is predominantly rural and has many small towns, villages and hamlets. The Wealden landscape is varied, ranging from the Ashdown Forest in the north to the South Downs and the coastal part is included in seats to the south.

A considerable portion of the population is retired or work in London, Brighton or other regional employment bases at a managerial or advanced professional level.  Electoral Calculus describes the seat as "Strong Right" characterised by retired, socially conservative voters who strongly supported Brexit.

Members of Parliament

Elections

Elections in the 2010s

Elections in the 2000s

Elections in the 1990s

This constituency underwent boundary changes between the 1992 and 1997 general elections and thus change in share of vote is based on a notional calculation.

Elections in the 1980s

See also
List of parliamentary constituencies in East Sussex

Notes

References

Sources
Election result, 2017 (BBC)
Election result, 2010 (BBC)
Election result, 2005 (BBC)
Election results, 1997 - 2001 (BBC)
Election results, 1997 - 2001 (Election Demon)
Election results, 1983 - 1992 (Election Demon)
Election results, 1992 - 2005 (Guardian)

Parliamentary constituencies in South East England
Constituencies of the Parliament of the United Kingdom established in 1983
Politics of East Sussex
Politics of Wealden District